There is an African-American community in Kansas, including in Kansas City, Kansas. Nicodemus, Kansas is the oldest surviving town west of the Mississippi River settled solely by African Americans.

Brown v. Board of Education of Topeka was decided in 1954.

As of the 2020 U.S. Census, African Americans were 5.7% of the state's population. They are concentrated in Wyandotte County and Geary County.

History

Kansas was admitted to the United States as a free state in 1861. Some Black slaves were imported to Kansas. Many Black migrants came from the Southern United States as hired laborers while others traveled to Kansas as escaped slaves via the Underground Railroad. Some moved from the South during the Kansas Exodus in the 1860s. Kansas was not immune from Jim Crow segregation, race riots, white supremacy and violence from racist white people. Newspapers have documented incidents of white people lynching a black man in Fort Scott and white mobs attacking black Americans held in jails in Leavenworth, Topeka, and Kansas City.

In 1954, Brown v. Board of Education of Topeka was decided and desegregated schools nationwide.

Geography
Nicodemus, Kansas was settled by African Americans in the 1870s, commemorated in the Nicodemus National Historic Site. Nicodemus is the oldest remaining town settled entirely by African Americans located west of the Mississippi River. Most of the town's founders were formerly enslaved. Most Black people in Kansas originally lived in the Eastern portions of the state because the Underground Railroad had stops there. Kansas City also has a significant Black population.

Media

The Call is headquartered in Kansas City, Missouri and also is distributed to African-Americans in Kansas City, Kansas.

Politics

The Kansas African American Legislative Caucus is the political caucus of the Kansas Legislature.

Education 
Sumner High School was a racially segregated high school in Kansas City, Kansas. The Interstate Literary Association was established in Topeka in 1892. It was a multi-state education organization for African Americans.

Notable people

 Janelle Monáe, a singer and actress
 Bobby Lashley
 Gordon Parks
 George Washington Carver
 Langston Hughes
 Hattie McDaniel
 Gale Sayers
 Barry Sanders
 Elwood "Bingo" DeMoss
 Charles "Bird" Parker
 Coleman Hawkins
 Eva Jessye

See also

History of Kansas
Demographics of Kansas
History of slavery in Kansas
List of African-American newspapers in Kansas

References

Further reading
 
 Kansas State Historical Society, Historic Sites Survey. Historic Preservation in Kansas.  Black History Sites, A Beginning Point. Topeka: Kansas State Historical Society, 1977.

External links
 
 African Americans in Kansas and the West - List of books and articles about the subject
 Seeking the Promised Land: African American Migrations to Kansas
 Learn the history of African American settlement in Kansas
 AFRICAN AMERICANS

 
African Americans